Shaul Bassi is professor of English and postcolonial literature at the Ca' Foscari University of Venice, Italy. He is the director of the Venice Center for Humanities and Social Change. His work has focused on Shakespeare and post-colonial theory. Bassi has also written about the present environmental and social issues of Venice, as well as the city's history.

Books 
 Shakespeare’s Italy and Italy’s Shakespeare. Place, "Race," Politics, Reproducing Shakespeare: New Studies in Adaptation and Appropriation, Palgrave Macmillan, 2016.<ref>Reviews of Shakespeare’s Italy and Italy’s Shakespeare:

</ref>
 The Ghetto Inside Out, with Isabella Di Lenardo, Corte del Fondego, 2013
 Visions of Venice in Shakespeare, edited with Laura Tosi, Ashgate, 2011, reprinted by Routledge, 2016.
 Essere qualcun altro. Ebrei postmoderni e postcoloniali, Cafoscarina, 2011.
 Le metamorfosi di Otello, Storia di un'etnicità immaginaria'', Graphis, 2000.

References

External links 
 Shaul Bassi's page at Ca' Foscari University
 The Venice Center for Humanities and Social Change
 Shaul Bassi's page at academia.edu

Academic staff of the Ca' Foscari University of Venice
Year of birth missing (living people)
Living people